Igor Nenezić (born 23 March 1984) is a Slovenian professional footballer who plays for FC Koper as a goalkeeper.

Club career
Nenezić was born in Kranj and played football with NK Triglav Kranj before starting his professional career with NK Primorje. After spending five years with Triglav Kranj and five years with Primorje, Nenezić transferred to FC Koper. Nenezić moved abroad for the first time in his career in 2014 to play for Iranian club Rah Ahan.

On 11 January 2017, he returned to FC Koper.

International career
Nenezić played for youth selections of Slovenian national football team, and was also called up several times for the senior team by Matjaž Kek, during Slovenia's EURO 2008 qualifying campaign as a replacement goalkeeper, but failed to make an appearance.

Honours

Club
Koper
Slovenian First League: 2009–10
Slovenian Supercup: 2010

References

External links
 PrvaLiga profile 
 
 

1984 births
Living people
Sportspeople from Kranj
Slovenian footballers
Association football goalkeepers
NK Triglav Kranj players
NK Primorje players
FC Koper players
Rah Ahan players
Slovenian PrvaLiga players
Slovenian Second League players
Slovenian expatriate footballers
Expatriate footballers in Iran
Slovenia youth international footballers
Slovenia under-21 international footballers